Béla Scitovszky de Nagykér (23 April 1878 – 20 August 1959) was a Hungarian politician, who served as Interior Minister between 1926 and 1931. He was the Speaker of the National Assembly of Hungary between 1922 and 1926.

References
 Magyar Életrajzi Lexikon

External links
 

1878 births
1959 deaths
Politicians from Budapest
Hungarian Interior Ministers
Speakers of the National Assembly of Hungary
Bela